Ridge Mobulu -son of Ogamyanu Mobulu (born 29 June 1991) is a Swiss-born Congolese footballer.

Career

Youth
Mobulu grew up in Lausanne.

Professional
Mobulu made his professional debut with Lausanne-Sport on 9 December 2007, in a game against Winterthur in Switzerland's second division Challenge League. He made 20 appearances for Lausanne in the 2009–10, scoring five goals, and spent six month on loan with Bulle of Switzerland's third-tier 1. Liga between January and June 2010.

Mobulu moved to Canada in the summer of 2010 to join the Vancouver Whitecaps, initially as a member of the team's PDL affiliate Vancouver Whitecaps Residency. He made his full Whitecaps debut on July 28, coming on as a second-half substitute for Blake Wagner during a 1-0 away win over Montreal Impact, and scored his first Whitecaps goal during a 2-2 home draw versus Austin Aztex on August 29.

On 4 January 2019, Mobulu re-joined Yverdon-Sport FC.

International
Mobulu played with the Swiss national U-15 team in 2005, but has since declared his intention to play for the Democratic Republic of the Congo should the opportunity arise. Though born and raised in Switzerland, Mobulu is a citizen of DR Congo through his parents, Ngia Jose Nzobo and Florent Kashama Mobulu.

References

External links
 Vancouver Whitecaps bio
 

1991 births
Living people
Democratic Republic of the Congo footballers
Association football forwards
FC Lausanne-Sport players
Vancouver Whitecaps (1986–2010) players
FC Stade Nyonnais players
Yverdon-Sport FC players
FC Luzern players
Swiss Challenge League players
USSF Division 2 Professional League players
Swiss 1. Liga (football) players
Swiss Super League players
Swiss Promotion League players
2. Liga Interregional players
Democratic Republic of the Congo expatriate footballers
Expatriate soccer players in Canada
Democratic Republic of the Congo expatriate sportspeople in Canada